The Milky Way Bridge, or Melkwegbrug, is a pedestrian/cycling bridge in Purmerend, Netherlands. It was designed by NEXT Architects and opened in 2006.

References

Purmerend
Bridges in North Holland